Rosedale is a ghost town in Boyd County, Nebraska, United States.

History
The post office at Rosedale was established in 1898 and discontinued in 1903.

References

Geography of Boyd County, Nebraska